The Hirth HM 504 is a four-cylinder air-cooled inverted inline engine. The HM 504 was a popular engine for light aircraft of the 1930s-1940s, and it was used to power a number of Germany's trainer aircraft of World War II. The engine featured a cast magnesium alloy crankcase.  The Hitachi Hatsukaze Model 11 was a Japanese licensed version.

Applications
Bücker Bü 131
Bücker Bü 181
BŻ-1 GIL (helicopter)
Klemm Kl 35
Matra-Cantinieau MC-101 (helicopter)
Morane-Saulnier MS.603
Payen Arbalète
Repülőgépgyár Levente II

Specifications (HM 504 A-2)

See also

References

External links
Göbler-Hirthmotoren Company website (nothing in there about pre-war engines)

Hirth aircraft engines
Air-cooled aircraft piston engines
1930s aircraft piston engines
Inverted aircraft piston engines